Jádson Rodrigues da Silva, professionally known as Jádson (born 5 October 1983), is a Brazilian professional footballer who plays as an attacking midfielder. He is currently playing for Vitória.

Having begun his career at Atlético Paranaense, he moved to Shakhtar Donetsk in 2005. In eight seasons at the club, he won six Ukrainian Premier League titles, three Ukrainian Cup, and the UEFA Cup in 2009. He then returned to Brazil, first to São Paulo, before switching to Corinthians as part of a swap with Alexandre Pato.

Jádson made his international debut for Brazil in 2011, representing the nation at that year's Copa América. He was also part of their squad which won the 2013 FIFA Confederations Cup on home soil.

Club career

Atlético Paranaense
Born in Londrina, Jádson began his career playing for Atlético Paranaense in Brazil, where he helped the squad to win two Paranaense Championships (2002, 2005) and to be runners-up in the Brazilian league (2004).

Shakhtar Donetsk
In 2005, Jádson sealed a transfer to Shakhtar Donetsk. He scored the winning goal in extra time for Shakhtar in a 2–1 victory to win the 2009 UEFA Cup Final against Werder Bremen in Istanbul and was named Man of the match, as well as having previously scored 3 goals in the competition (a total of four in the UEFA Cup) and four goals in the Champions League including a hat-trick against FC Basel, to bring his total to nine goals in European competitions in 2008–09. He almost joins Arsenal during the summer in 2011.

São Paulo
After seven years in Ukraine, Jádson returned to Brazil in early 2012. He was bought for €4 million by São Paulo FC.

Corinthians
On 5 February 2014, Jádson was involved in a transaction between São Paulo and Corinthians in which he was traded to the latter and Alexandre Pato transferred to São Paulo. Eleven days after signing, on his debut for Corithians, in a 1–1 draw against rival Palmeiras, Jádson left the game to applause, substituted by Renato Augusto, and said the following words: "I am very happy to wear Corinthians' number 10 shirt. Great names of football, as Neto and Rivellino, already wore this number in the club's shirt. The fans can be certain I'll play the best I can."

International career
Jádson made his international debut for Brazil on 9 February 2011, coming off the bench in a 1–0 loss to France. Jádson was called up to the Brazil squad for the 2011 Copa América held in Argentina. He was an unused substitute in their disappointing 0–0 draw against Venezuela in the first game. However, he started the following match against Paraguay, replacing Robinho on the right wing after the former's limp display against Venezuela.  He opened up the scoring with a long range shot, with Brazil eventually salvaging a 2–2 draw in the 89th minute.

Jadson also was called up for the 2013 FIFA Confederations Cup on home soil. He made one appearance in the tournament, coming on as a 73rd-minute substitute for Hulk in the final, a 3–0 win over Spain.

Style of play
Jádson is known for his technical ability, passing, scoring threat and ability to use both feet.

Career statistics

Club

International
Scores and results list Brazil's goal tally first.

Honours

Club

Shakhtar Donetsk
 Vyshcha Liha/Ukrainian Premier League: 2004–05, 2005–06, 2007–08, 2009–10, 2010–11, 2011–12
 Ukrainian Cup: 2007–08, 2010–11, 2011–12
 Ukrainian Super Cup: 2005, 2008, 2010
 UEFA Cup: 2008–09

São Paulo
 Copa Sudamericana: 2012

Corinthians
 Campeonato Brasileiro Série A: 2015, 2017
 Campeonato Paulista: 2017, 2018, 2019

Tianjin Quanjian
 China League One: 2016

International
Brazil
 FIFA Confederations Cup: 2013

Individual
 Campeonato Brasileiro Série A Team of the Year: 2015
 Campeonato Brasileiro Série A top assist provider: 2015

References

External links

 
 
 Jadson profile at FC Shakhtar Donetsk website.
 ThinkBall.com – Profile
 

1983 births
Living people
Brazilian footballers
Brazilian expatriate footballers
Expatriate footballers in Ukraine
Expatriate footballers in China
Brazilian expatriate sportspeople in Ukraine
Brazilian expatriate sportspeople in China
Association football midfielders
Club Athletico Paranaense players
FC Shakhtar Donetsk players
UEFA Cup winning players
São Paulo FC players
Tianjin Tianhai F.C. players
Campeonato Brasileiro Série A players
Campeonato Brasileiro Série B players
Campeonato Brasileiro Série C players
Ukrainian Premier League players
China League One players
Sportspeople from Londrina
Brazil international footballers
2011 Copa América players
2013 FIFA Confederations Cup players
FIFA Confederations Cup-winning players
Sport Club Corinthians Paulista players
Avaí FC players
Esporte Clube Vitória players